Mohammadshahr; also known as Mohammadabad (Persian: محمّد آباد), also Romanized as Moḩammadābād is one of the five cities in the Central District of Karaj County, Alborz province, Iran. At the 2006 census, its population was 83,126 in 21,071 households. The latest census in 2016 counted 119,418 people in 35,902 households.

References 

Karaj County

Cities in Alborz Province

Populated places in Alborz Province

Populated places in Karaj County